Nationality words link to articles with information on the nation's poetry or literature (for instance, Irish or France).

Events
 25 November – Eustache Deschamps completes his treatise on verse, L’Art de dictier et de fere chansons, balades, virelais et rondeaulx.
 Gruffudd Llwyd active in Wales.

Works published

Births
Death years link to the corresponding "[year] in poetry" article. There are conflicting or unreliable sources for the birth years of many people born in this period; where sources conflict, the poet is listed again and the conflict is noted:

1392:
 Alain Chartier (died 1430), French poet and political writer

1394:
 Antonio Beccadelli (died 1471), Italian poet, canon lawyer, scholar, diplomat, and chronicler
 Charles, duc d'Orléans (died 1465), French
 Ikkyū (died 1481), eccentric, iconoclastic Japanese Zen Buddhist priest and poet

1395:
 Michault Taillevent (died 1451), French

1397:
 Ausiàs March (died 1459), Valencian poet
 Nōami (died 1471), Japanese painter and renga poet in the service of the Ashikaga shogunate

1398:
 Kabir, some dispute with his years of birth and death (died 1518), mystic composer and saint of India, whose literature has greatly influenced the Bhakti movement of India
 Inigo Lopez de Mendoza (died 1458), Spanish

Deaths
Birth years link to the corresponding "[year] in poetry" article:

1390:
 Hafez (born 1315), Persian lyric poet

1392
 Lalleshwari (born 1320), Kashmiri poet and mystic

1395:
 13 March – John Barbour (born c. 1320), Scottish poet and the first major literary voice to write in Scots language
 Peter Suchenwirt (born 1320), Austrian poet and herald

See also

 Poetry
 14th century in poetry
 14th century in literature
 List of years in poetry
 Grands Rhétoriqueurs
 French Renaissance literature
 Renaissance literature
 Spanish Renaissance literature

Other events:
 Other events of the 14th century
 Other events of the 15th century

15th century:
 15th century in poetry
 15th century in literature

Notes

14th-century poetry
Poetry